Chaleh Zard (also Romanized as Chāleh Zard) is a village in Khangiran Rural District, in the Central District of Sarakhs County, Razavi Khorasan Province, Iran. At the 2006 census, its population was 981, in 194 families.

References 

Populated places in Sarakhs County